Chloranilic acid is an organic compound with the chemical formula .  It is a red-orange solid.  The compound is obtained by hydrolysis of chloranil:
 
It is centrosymmetric, planar molecule.  It also crystallizes as a dihydrate.

Chloranilic acid is a noteworthy hydroxyquinone that is somewhat acidic owing to the presence of the two chloride substituents.  The conjugate base, C6H2Cl2O4]2- readily forms coordination complexes often linking pairs of many metal ions.

See also
 Chloranil

References

Chlorobenzenes
1,4-Benzoquinones
Hydroxybenzoquinones